Oxford County is a county in the state of Maine, United States. As of the 2020 Census, the county had a population of 57,777. Its county seat is the town of Paris. The county was formed on March 4, 1805, by the Massachusetts General Court in the Maine District from northerly portions of York and Cumberland counties. It borders the Canadian province of Quebec. Part of Oxford County is included in the Lewiston-Auburn, Maine metropolitan New England City and Town Area while a different part of Oxford County is included in the Portland-South Portland-Biddeford, Maine metropolitan New England City and Town Area.

Geography

Adjacent counties and municipalities
 Franklin County – northeast
 Androscoggin County – east
 Cumberland County – southeast
 York County – south
 Carroll County, New Hampshire – southwest
 Coös County, New Hampshire – west
 Le Granit Regional County Municipality, Quebec – north

National protected areas
 Umbagog National Wildlife Refuge (part)
 White Mountain National Forest (part)

Demographics

Ancestries
As of 2015, the largest self-reported ancestry groups in Oxford County, Maine were:

2000 census
At the 2000 census there were 54,755 people, 22,314 households, and 15,173 families living in the county.  The population density was 26 people per square mile (10/km2).  There were 32,295 housing units at an average density of 16 per square mile (6/km2).  The racial makeup of the county was 98.25% White, 0.17% Black or African American, 0.28% Native American, 0.37% Asian, 0.02% Pacific Islander, 0.11% from other races, and 0.80% from two or more races.  0.53% of the population were Hispanic or Latino of any race. 23.6% were of English, 13.9% French, 13.7% United States or American, 10.1% Irish and 8.4% French Canadian ancestry according to Census 2000. 95.9% spoke English and 2.6% French as their first language.
Of the 22,314 households 30.40% had children under the age of 18 living with them, 54.10% were married couples living together, 9.50% had a female householder with no husband present, and 32.00% were non-families. 25.60% of households were one person and 11.00% were one person aged 65 or older.  The average household size was 2.42 and the average family size was 2.87.

The age distribution was 24.20% under the age of 18, 6.50% from 18 to 24, 27.80% from 25 to 44, 25.50% from 45 to 64, and 16.10% 65 or older.  The median age was 40 years. For every 100 females there were 95.40 males.  For every 100 females age 18 and over, there were 93.70 males.

The median household income was $33,435 and the median family income  was $39,794. Males had a median income of $30,641 versus $21,233 for females. The per capita income for the county was $16,945.  About 8.30% of families and 11.80% of the population were below the poverty line, including 14.80% of those under age 18 and 10.10% of those age 65 or over.

2010 census
At the 2010 census, there were 57,833 people, 24,300 households, and 15,781 families living in the county. The racial makeup of the county was 96.8% white, 0.6% Asian, 0.4% American Indian, 0.4% black or African American, 0.3% from other races, and 1.5% from two or more races. Those of Hispanic or Latino origin made up 1.0% of the population. In terms of ancestry, 23.6% were English, 14.8% were Irish, 8.2% were American, 6.4% were German, and 5.6% were French Canadian.

Of the 24,300 households, 28.1% had children under the age of 18 living with them, 49.0% were married couples living together, 10.4% had a female householder with no husband present, 35.1% were non-families, and 27.1% of households were made up of individuals. The average household size was 2.35 and the average family size was 2.81. The median age was 44.6 years.

The median household income was $39,748 and the median family income  was $48,000. Males had a median income of $37,892 versus $30,187 for females. The per capita income for the county was $21,254. About 9.6% of families and 13.2% of the population were below the poverty line, including 17.6% of those under age 18 and 12.2% of those age 65 or over.

Politics

Voter registration

From 1880 to 1988, Oxford County was dominated by the Republican Party in presidential elections, only failing to back a Republican candidate in 1912, 1964, and 1968. The county flipped in 1992 to become consistently Democratic like the rest of Maine, staying that way until 2012. However, it made a 27.8 point swing (the largest statewide) to back Republican Donald Trump in 2016 as he won Maine's second congressional district containing the county.

|}

Recreation
Oxford County is home to many summer camps. Some of these camps are Camp Wekeela, Kamp Kohut, Camp Wyonegonic, Forest Acres Camp for Girls and Maine Teen Camp.

Communities

Towns

 Andover
 Bethel
 Brownfield
 Buckfield
 Byron
 Canton
 Denmark
 Dixfield
 Fryeburg
 Gilead
 Greenwood
 Hanover
 Hartford
 Hebron
 Hiram
 Lincoln Plantation
 Lovell
 Mexico
 Newry
 Norway
 Otisfield
 Oxford
 Paris (county seat)
 Peru
 Porter
 Roxbury
 Rumford
 Stoneham
 Stow
 Sumner
 Sweden
 Upton
 Waterford
 West Paris
 Woodstock

Unorganized territories

 North Oxford
 South Oxford
 Milton Plantation
 Magalloway Plantation

Census-designated places

 Bethel
 Dixfield
 Fryeburg
 Kezar Falls
 Mexico
 Norway
 Oxford
 Rumford
 South Paris

Other unincorporated communities

 Center Lovell
 Dickvale
 North Waterford
 Waterford Flat

See also
 National Register of Historic Places listings in Oxford County, Maine

References

External links

 Official Website of Oxford County
 Maine Genealogy: Oxford County, Maine

 
Maine counties
1805 establishments in Massachusetts
Populated places established in 1805